The  is a city tram station located on the Shin-Minato Harbor Line in Imizu, Toyama Prefecture, Japan. This station is unmanned.

Structure
Koshinokata Station has one side platform.

Surrounding area
Toyama Prefectural Ferry Port

Railway stations in Toyama Prefecture